The Lava Falls Trail is a hiking trail on the North Rim of the Grand Canyon National Park, located in the U.S. state of Arizona. It descends from the north rim of the Grand Canyon just west of the extinct volcano known as Vulcan's Throne to the Colorado River.

See also
Uinkaret volcanic field
 The Grand Canyon
 List of trails in Grand Canyon National Park

External links
 	Lava Falls Trail at The American Southwest. Accessed 5/26/09.

Hiking trails in Grand Canyon National Park
Grand Canyon, North Rim

Grand Canyon, North Rim (west)